Academia Fútbol Club was a Colombian football (soccer) team, based in Bogotá. The club was founded in 2005 and dissolved in 2012, becoming Llaneros F.C.

History
Academia Fútbol Club appeared at first as a training school for players between 18 and 25 years of Compensar in 1999, under the name of Escuela de Fútbol Compensar – MasterCard. The team participated in the Primera C under the name of Compensar F.C.. The directives, noting the success of the team, decided to invest and acquire at the DIMAYOR the entry form of Chía Fútbol Club to join the Categoría Primera B. The new club was named Academia Fútbol Club and started participating since 2005. In that season, the team was able to reach the quadrangulars.

Academia had its best season in 2007. In the first tournament of the year was runner-up after losing the final against Envigado FC. In the first game tied at home 1:1, 0:0 in the second tied, and in penalty kicks lose 7:6. In the second tournament the team is once again runner to lose both games in the final 2:1 against Envigado FC anew, with goals from Carlos Sciucatti for Academia. In the return match, played at the Estadio Compensar, Ricardo Laborde scored for Academia, but the match ended 1:2. On November 28 and December 1 Academy played against Deportivo Pereira, to define the second promoted to the Primera A for 2008. In the first leg the match finished tied (1:1), in the second leg, Pereira defeated Academia 3:1.

In 2012 the team was sold to Villavicencio, due to budget cuts of Compensar. The decision to sell the team was approved on March 22. On March 27 became official the new team: Llaneros F.C.

Stadium

External links

 
Association football clubs established in 2005
2005 establishments in Colombia
Defunct football clubs in Colombia
Categoría Primera B clubs